Wentworth is a civil parish in the Metropolitan Borough of Rotherham, South Yorkshire, England.  The parish contains 82 listed buildings that are recorded in the National Heritage List for England.  Of these, three are listed at Grade I, the highest of the three grades, eight are at Grade II*, the middle grade, and the others are at Grade II, the lowest grade.  The parish includes the village of Wentworth and the surrounding area.  The most important building in the parish is Wentworth Woodhouse, a large country house, which is described as "one of England's greatest and most remarkable houses", and is "celebrated for being the longest front of any English country house".  The house is listed together with associated structures and items in its grounds.  Most of the other listed buildings are houses, cottages, and associated structures, farmhouses and farm buildings.   The other listed buildings include churches and items in churchyards, a public house, a former school with attached almshouses, a folly, a mausoleum and a memorial tower, two windmills converted into houses, bridges, a weir and a causeway, a milestone and a milepost, workshops and a forge, a junior school, a former mechanics' institute, a war memorial, and a telephone kiosk.


Key

Buildings

References

Citations

Sources

 

Lists of listed buildings in South Yorkshire
Buildings and structures in the Metropolitan Borough of Rotherham
Wentworth, South Yorkshire